The Washington County Courthouse in Washington, Iowa, United States, was built in 1887. It was individually listed on the National Register of Historic Places in 1981 as a part of the County Courthouses in Iowa Thematic Resource. In 2013 it was included as a contributing property in the Washington Downtown Historic District. The courthouse is the third building the county has used for court functions and county administration.

History

Washington County's first courthouse was an  frame building built in the 1840s. It was used as a school house and church as well as a courthouse. The second courthouse was built in 1847. The county was not satisfied with the carpentry work performed so they deducted $50 from the cupola alone and $110 on the balance of the building. The present courthouse was built for $75,000 in 1887. It was designed by the Des Moines architectural firm of Foster & Liebbe, and built by Thomas Colwell and Hugh Colwell.

Architecture
The courthouse for Washington County is considered an excellent example of Victorian Romanesque courthouses in Iowa. It features a variety of arch forms, and a three-stage clock tower. It was constructed of locally made bricks and was trimmed in stone. The bell in the clock tower is made of bronze, tin and brass. Statues representing Justice and Liberty are located on the lower level of the tower. The present main entrance was added at a later date. The south and west elevations both have projecting pavilions that terminate in gable ends. The significance of the courthouse is derived from its association with county government, and the political power and prestige of Washington as the county seat.

References

Government buildings completed in 1887
Romanesque Revival architecture in Iowa
Buildings and structures in Washington County, Iowa
County courthouses in Iowa
Courthouses on the National Register of Historic Places in Iowa
National Register of Historic Places in Washington County, Iowa
Individually listed contributing properties to historic districts on the National Register in Iowa
Washington, Iowa
Clock towers in Iowa